Arjun Punj (born 27 July) is an Indian television and film actor. Punj is notable for playing the antagonist role as Dr. Aman in Star TV's show in long running television show Sanjivani.

Filmography

Films
 Tere Liye (2001) as Aditya Verma
Joruga Husharuga (2002) (Telugu film)
 Time Pass (2005) as Vishal Sharma
 One Two Three (2008) as Sonu Narayan

Television
 2003 Sanjivani as Dr. Aman 
 2005 Aahat as Sunil (Season 2 - Episode 11 & Episode 12)
 2005 - 2006 Woh Rehne Waali Mehlon Ki as Raj Goyal / Prince Thapar
 2006 Nach Baliye 2 as Contestant 
 2006 - 2007 Saathii Re as Prem
 2013 Arjun as Inspector Raghu Rajput (Episode 124)
 2014 Diya Aur Baati Hum as ATS Officer Arjun Chaudhary

References

External links
 

Living people
Indian television presenters
Indian Sikhs
Indian male soap opera actors
Male actors in Hindi cinema
21st-century Indian male actors
Indian male film actors
Male actors from Mumbai
1967 births